Alan John (born 7 May 1958 in Sydney) is an Australian composer. He studied music at the University of Sydney, graduating in 1980. His compositions include original music for various plays, films (such as Holding the Man, Three Dollars and The Bank) and TV series (including Love My Way), and the musicals Jonah Jones, Orlando Rourke and Snugglepot and Cuddlepie.

Operas
His opera The Eighth Wonder was premiered in 1995 by Opera Australia. It was revived in 2000, during the Sydney Olympics Arts Festival, and again in 2016. In May 2008, his chamber opera Through the Looking Glass, to a libretto by Andrew Upton, was premiered by the Victorian Opera at the Malthouse Theatre, Melbourne, conducted by Richard Gill. In May 2011, his opera How to Kill your Husband (and other handy household hints), to a libretto by Timothy Daly and based on Kathy Lette's 2007 book of the same name, premiered at the same venue under the same conductor.

Awards and nominations

APRA-AGSC Awards
The annual Screen Music Awards are presented by Australasian Performing Right Association (APRA) and Australian Guild of Screen Composers (AGSC) for television and film scores and soundtracks.

|-
| 2004 || Shark Net – John || Best Music for a Television Series or Serial || 
|-
| 2005 || Three Dollars – John || Best Music for a Mini-Series or Telemovie || 
|-
| 2007 || "Episode 7" – Dangerous – John, Steven Francis || Best Music for a Mini-Series or Telemovie ||

Helpmann Awards
The Helpmann Awards are for live performance in Australia, including theatre, musicals, opera, dance and live music.

|-
| 2007 || Mother Courage and Her Children || Best Original Score || 
|-
| 2011 || Diary of a Madman || Best Original Score || 
|-
| 2012 || The White Guard || Best Original Score ||

References

External links

1958 births
Living people
20th-century classical composers
21st-century classical composers
APRA Award winners
Australian film score composers
Australian male classical composers
Australian musical theatre composers
Australian opera composers
Helpmann Award winners
Male film score composers
Male opera composers
Musicians from Sydney
University of Sydney alumni
20th-century Australian male musicians
20th-century Australian musicians
21st-century Australian male musicians
21st-century Australian musicians